Medline may refer to:

MEDLINE, a bibliographic database of life sciences and biomedical information
Medline Industries, a hospital supply company
MedlinePlus, a consumer health information website